The Browns Falls is a plunge waterfall on the Spring Creek (South Branch) in Killarney, Southern Downs Region,  Queensland, Australia.

Location and features

Four other waterfalls are located in the area surrounding Killarney, including the Teviot Falls in the north at Teviot Gap, Queen Mary Falls, Daggs Falls and Upper Browns Falls.

See also

 List of waterfalls of Queensland

References

Waterfalls of Queensland
Darling Downs
Plunge waterfalls
Southern Downs Region